Sacrifice is an American thriller television series that premiered on BET+ as a pilot movie on December 19, 2019, followed by the official series premiere on November 4, 2021.

Plot
Protagonist Daniella Hernandez (an entertainment lawyer) navigates through the lives of her rich and scandalous Hollywood clients. Along the journey, she also make discoveries about her own past.

Cast and characters

Main
Paula Patton as Daniella Hernandez
Juan Antonio as Dominiq Mayfield aka Big Dom
V. Bozeman as Tamika Bland
Altonio Jackson as Steven Somwon
Nelson Bonilla as Miguel Costas
Erica Ash as Beverly Rucker
Marques Houston as Jason Pratt

Recurring
Liliana Montenegro as Gabriella Hernandez
Josué Gutierrez as Oscar Baptiste
Frankie Smith as Chauncey Winchester
GG Townson as Jameson Howard
Tedrick Martin as Jameson’s Bodyguard
Ashlei Lewis as Jameson’s MUA and best friend
Clifton Powell as Sylvester
Lamman Rucker as Jazzico
Richard Roundtree as Ellis Shaw
Vanessa Bell Calloway as Carol Steinburg

Guest
Michael Toland as Arnold Lang
James Trevena as Joshua Lang

Episodes

Series overview

Film (2019)

Season 1 (2021)

Production

Development
On August 15, 2019, a movie pilot titled Sacrifice was announced. The movie premiered on December 19, 2019. The series was picked up by BET+ on September 28, 2020. The series premiered on November 4, 2021.

Casting
The main cast was revealed on August 15, 2019. On August 16, 2021, Frankie Smith was cast in a recurring role. On October 21, 2021, GG Townson was cast in a recurring role.

References

External links

2020s American black television series
2021 American television series debuts
2021 American television series endings
American thriller television series
BET+ original programming
English-language television shows